Georges Cravenne (24 January 1914 – 10 January 2009), real name Joseph-Raoul Cohen, was a French film producer, publicity agent and founder of the César Award. He received an Honorary César in 2000.

Marriages
He married French actress Françoise Arnoul in 1956. They divorced in 1964.

On 18 October 1973, his second wife Danielle Cravenne was shot dead by a police sniper at Marignane airport in Marseille.

Notes

External links
 

French film producers
Jewish film people
Grand Officiers of the Légion d'honneur
Commanders of the Ordre national du Mérite
César Honorary Award recipients
20th-century French Jews
1914 births
2009 deaths